The Thirst is a 2007 American horror film directed by Jeremy Kasten.

Plot
Recovering drug addicts Maxx (Matt Keeslar) and Lisa (Clare Kramer) are persuaded by vampire clan leader Darius (Jeremy Sisto) to give up their humanity and join him as vampires. They do so, but then give up the vampire's blood addiction – the Thirst. After enduring the withdrawal symptoms, the couple turns against the band of vampires who made them.

Cast
 Matt Keeslar as Maxx
 Clare Kramer as Lisa
 Jeremy Sisto as Darius
 Serena Scott Thomas as Mariel
 Neil Jackson as Duke of Earl
 Adam Baldwin as Lenny
 Kylah Kim as Sister #1
 Ave Rose Rodil as Sister #2
 Alicia Morton as Sara
 Charlotte Ayanna as Macey
 Erik Palladino as Jason
 Blythe Metz as Sasha
 Michael Mantell as Doctor
 Dawn Weld as Kiki
 Ellie Cornell as Nurse Linda
 Tom Lenk as Kronos

See also
Vampire film

External links
 

2006 horror films
American vampire films
2006 films
Films scored by Joe Kraemer
2000s English-language films
Films directed by Jeremy Kasten
2000s American films